Physics and Chemistry of Liquids is a peer-reviewed scientific journal that publishes experimental and theoretical research articles focused on the science of the liquid state.

The editors-in-chief are N. H. March and G. G. N. Angilella. According to the Journal Citation Reports, the journal has a 2011 impact factor of 0.603.

Scope
The journal's scope includes all types of liquids, from monatomic liquids and their mixtures, through charged liquids to molecular liquids.

Abstracting and indexing 
Physics and Chemistry of Liquids is abstracted and indexed in the following databases:

 GEOBASE
 Chemical Abstracts Service - CASSI
 PubMed - MEDLINE
 Science Citation Index - Web of Science

References

External links 
 

Chemistry journals
Physics journals
Publications established in 1968
English-language journals
Bimonthly journals
Taylor & Francis academic journals